Ingram House is a historic building on the street of Bootham, York, England. It was built as an almshouse for ten poor widows between 1630 and 1640 by real estate developer and politician Sir Arthur Ingram and was originally known as Ingram's Hospital.  It was damaged during the Siege of York and was restored in 1649. It is the most important mid-seventeenth century building in Bootham, pre-classical and composed of eleven bays of two low storeys, but with a four-storey central tower.  The middle doorway dates back to the Norman period, and is believed to have once been a doorway to Holy Trinity Priory.

Charles I of England stayed at the house in 1642.  In 1959, it was converted into four flats.  It was listed as a Grade II* building in 1954.

References

Bootham
Residential buildings completed in 1640
Grade II* listed buildings in York
Grade II* listed almshouses
Almshouses in York
1640 establishments in England